The following highways are numbered 37A:

Canada
 British Columbia Highway 37A

India
  National Highway 37A (India)

United States
 Indiana State Road 37A (former)
 Nebraska Highway 37A (former)
 Nebraska Recreation Road 37A
 New York State Route 37A (former)
 County Route 37A (Cayuga County, New York)
 South Dakota Highway 37A